Gene Designer is a computer software package for bioinformatics. It is used by molecular biologists from academia, government, and the pharmaceutical, chemical, agricultural, and biotechnology industries to design, clone, and validate genetic sequences. It is proprietary software, released as freeware needing registration.

Features 
Gene Designer enables molecular biologists to manage the full gene design process in one application, using a range of design tools.

 Algorithms for in silico cloning, codon optimization, back translation, and primer design
 Graphic molecular View to display, annotate, and edit constructs
 Customizable database to store, manage, and track genetic elements, genes, and constructs
 Drag and drop interface to move sequence elements within or between constructs (patented feature)
 Search feature for sequence motifs, restriction sites, and open reading frames
 Codon optimize for recombinant protein production in any organism using multiple algorithms
 Remove or add restriction sites or other sequence motifs
 Recode open reading frames
 Check translation frames and fusion junctions
 Design oligonucleotides to sequence primers, includes a real time melting point calculator
 Cloning tool with drag and drop ability to cut, combine, and clone insert and vector

Educator and student use 
This free software has been incorporated into classroom and lab curricula for synthetic biology, systems biology, bioengineering, and bioinformatics. Students create and complete projects which manage the full gene design process in one application, using a range of design tools.

Examples of use in curricula:
 Synthetic Biophotonics Course; Utah State University, College of Engineering
 Lab Project using Gene Designer 2.0
 Systems Biology Lesson Overview
 Synthetic Biology Lesson Overview
 Student Projects

See also 
 Bioinformatics
 Computational biology
 Gene synthesis
 Vector (molecular biology), Vector DNA, Cloning vector, Expression vector
 Restriction map
 Molecular cloning
 List of open source bioinformatics software

References

 US Patent 7,805,252. Systems and methods for designing and ordering polynucleotides. Gustafsson, Govindarajan, Ness, Villalobos and Minshull.

External links 
 

Bioinformatics
Bioinformatics software
Genetics software